Bolívar is one of the forty subbarrios of Santurce, San Juan, Puerto Rico.

Demographics
In 2000, Bolívar had a population of 1,223.

In 2010, Bolívar had a population of 921 and a population density of 13,157.1 persons per square mile.

See also 
 
 List of communities in Puerto Rico

References

Santurce, San Juan, Puerto Rico
Municipality of San Juan